Matthew John "Matt" Rinaldo (September 1, 1931 – October 13, 2008) was an American Republican Party politician who represented New Jersey in the United States House of Representatives for ten terms, serving in the 12th congressional district (1973–1983) and in the 7th congressional district (1983–1993).

Early life and education
Born in Elizabeth, New Jersey, Rinaldo graduated from St. Benedict’s Prep in Newark, N.J. in 1949, then went on to receive a B.S. from Rutgers University (1953), an M.B.A., Seton Hall University (1959) and a D.P.A., from New York University, Robert F. Wagner Graduate School of Public Service (1979).

Political career
He was elected to the Union Township Zoning Board of Adjustment (1962–1963), the Union County Board of Chosen Freeholders (1963–1964), and the New Jersey Senate (1967–1972).

Congress
Rinaldo was elected as a Republican to the 93rd and to the nine succeeding U.S. Congresses (January 3, 1973 – January 3, 1993). Representative Rinaldo sat on the House Permanent Committee on Select Aging, as Minority Leader of the Committee, and the House Committee for Energy and Commerce.

Prior to his retirement, Rinaldo listed among his top accomplishments a bill to limit the airing of commercials during children's programming and securing public access to pollution data under the Superfund law.

Death
He died on October 13, 2008, from complications related to Parkinson's disease after several years of poor health.

References

External links

Matthew John Rinaldo at The Political Graveyard
Matthew John Rinaldo's obituary
 

1931 births
2008 deaths
American people of Italian descent
County commissioners in New Jersey
Republican Party New Jersey state senators
Robert F. Wagner Graduate School of Public Service alumni
Politicians from Elizabeth, New Jersey
People from Union Township, Union County, New Jersey
Rutgers University alumni
Seton Hall University alumni
Neurological disease deaths in New Jersey
Deaths from Parkinson's disease
Republican Party members of the United States House of Representatives from New Jersey
20th-century American politicians